Holy Trinity is a c.1577-1579 oil on canvas painting by El Greco, one of nine works he produced for the Abbey of Santo Domingo de Silos. Ferdinand VII of Spain acquired it from the sculptor Valeriano Salvatierra in 1832 and it now hangs in the Prado Museum in Madrid.

It shows God the Father holding the dead body of God the Son, both under the dove of the Holy Spirit. The anatomy of the figures is influenced by that of Michelangelo, whilst the chromaticism recalls that of Tintoretto and the composition those of Albrecht Dürer.

References

External links 
  
 

El Greco
Paintings by El Greco in the Museo del Prado
1570s paintings
Angels in art